The 1953 season was the forty-second season for Santos FC.

References

External links
Official Site 

Santos
1953
1953 in Brazilian football